Princess Bathildis of Anhalt-Dessau (29 December 183710 February 1902) was a Princess of Anhalt-Dessau and member of the House of Ascania by birth. As the wife of Prince William of Schaumburg-Lippe she was a Princess of Schaumburg-Lippe by marriage. She was a younger sister of Grand Duchess Adelaide of Luxembourg.

Early life
Bathildis was born at Dessau, Anhalt-Dessau, as the second child of Prince Frederick Augustus of Anhalt-Dessau (son of Frederick, Hereditary Prince of Anhalt-Dessau and Landgravine Amalie of Hesse-Homburg) and his wife Princess Marie Luise Charlotte of Hesse-Kassel, (daughter of Landgrave William of Hesse-Kassel and Princess Charlotte of Denmark).

Marriage
On 30 May 1862 at Dessau, Bathildis married Prince William of Schaumburg-Lippe, seventh child and third son of George William, Prince of Schaumburg-Lippe and his wife, Princess Ida of Waldeck and Pyrmont.

They had eight children:
Princess Charlotte of Schaumburg-Lippe (10 October 1864 – 16 July 1946), married in 1886 to William II of Württemberg, no issue.
Prince Franz Joseph of Schaumburg-Lippe (8 October 1865 – 4 September 1881)
Prince Frederick of Schaumburg-Lippe (30 January 1868 – 12 December 1945), married in 1896 to Princess Louise of Denmark, had issue.
Prince Albrecht of Schaumburg-Lippe (24 October 1869 – 25 December 1942), married in 1897 to Duchess Elsa of Württemberg, had issue.
Prince Maximilian of Schaumburg-Lippe (13 March 1871 – 1 April 1904), married in 1898 to Duchess Olga of Württemberg, had issue.
Princess Bathildis of Schaumburg-Lippe (21 May 1873 – 6 April 1962), married in 1895 to Friedrich, Prince of Waldeck and Pyrmont, had issue.
Princess Adelaide of Schaumburg-Lippe (22 September 1875 – 27 January 1971), married in 1898 to Ernst II, Duke of Saxe-Altenburg, had issue, divorced in 1920.
Princess Alexandra of Schaumburg-Lippe (9 June 1879 – 5 January 1949)

Later life
Princess Bathildis died on 10 February 1902 at Nachod Castle, Kingdom of Bohemia (now Náchod, Czech Republic).

Ancestry

1837 births
1902 deaths
Bathildis
Bathildis
People from Dessau-Roßlau